The Rio Tuba mine is a large nickel mine run by Nickel Asia Corporation in the west of the Philippines in Bataraza, Palawan. The 60.2 million tonnes of ore contains  tonnes of nickel metal. Production started in 1969.

An explication for this red color we can see at the side of this site?

References 

Nickel mines in the Philippines
Geography of Palawan